Vangsvatnet is a lake in the municipality of Voss in Vestland county, Norway.  The  lake lies in the central part of the municipality, on the southwestern shore of the municipal centre of Vossevangen.  The Vosso River flows through both Vangsvatnet and the lake Evangervatnet before it empties into Bolstadfjorden by the village of Bolstadøyri to the west.

The lake is used for various water-based extreme sports activities like Kite surfing and boat dragged paragliding. Other activities include paddleboarding, windsurfing and canoeing with Voss Flow. Vangsvatnet is named after the place Vangen—the municipal center and old churchsite of Voss. The last element is the finite form of vatn, meaning lake.  European route E16 and the Bergen Line both run along the northern shore of the lake.

See also
List of lakes in Norway

References

Voss
Lakes of Vestland